Saint-Germain-les-Belles is a railway station in Saint-Germain-les-Belles, Nouvelle-Aquitaine, France. The station is located on the Orléans–Montauban railway line. The station is served by TER (local) services operated by SNCF.

Train services
The following services currently call at Saint-Germain-les-Belles:
local service (TER Nouvelle-Aquitaine) Limoges - Uzerche - Brive-la-Gaillarde

References

Railway stations in Haute-Vienne